Charles Alfred Euston FitzRoy, 10th Duke of Grafton (4 June 1892 – 11 November 1970), known as Charles FitzRoy until 1936, was a British aristocrat, soldier, politician, and farmer.

Background and education
He was born at Euston Hall near Thetford, the eldest son of the Reverend Lord Charles Edward FitzRoy and of his wife, Hon. Ismay FitzRoy, daughter of Charles FitzRoy, 3rd Baron Southampton. His paternal grandparents were Augustus FitzRoy, 7th Duke of Grafton, and Anna Balfour. Another ancestor, Anne Warren, was the daughter of Admiral Sir Peter Warren and a descendant of the Schuyler family, the Van Cortlandt family, and the Delancey family, all from British North America.

He was educated at Wellington and then at the Royal Military College, Sandhurst.

Military career
In 1911, he joined the Royal Welch Fusiliers, who were stationed at Quetta in what is now Pakistan. In 1914, soon after the outbreak of the Great War, he went to France, and in 1917, he was appointed as aide-de-camp and comptroller to Lord Buxton, Governor General of South Africa. He remained in South Africa until 1920. In 1921, he retired from the army.

Farming
After retirement from the Army, he became a farmer at Coney Weston in Suffolk. From 1927 to 1936, he was land agent for his first wife's maternal uncle, Owen Hugh Smith, at Langham in Rutland. In 1936, he succeeded his cousin as Duke of Grafton and inherited the family estates based at Euston Hall.

Family
He married, firstly, Lady Doreen Maria Josepha Sydney Buxton (29 November 1897 – 28 July 1923), daughter of his commanding officer Sydney Buxton, 1st Earl Buxton, and his wife, Mildred Anne Smith, on 24 January 1918. They had three children:

 Hugh Denis Charles FitzRoy, 11th Duke of Grafton (3 April 1919 – 7 April 2011).
 Lady Anne Mildred Ismay FitzRoy (7 August 1920 – 4 November 2019), married Major Colin Dalzell Mackenzie and had issue.
 Lord Charles Oliver Edward FitzRoy (13 July 1923 – 6 August 1944), killed in action; unmarried.

A year after his first wife's death, he married, secondly, Lucy Eleanor Barnes (25 December 1897 – 11 September 1943), daughter of Sir George Stapylton Barnes and of his wife, Sybil de Gournay Buxton. The ceremony took place on 6 October 1924. Lucy was the first cousin of Charles' first wife. They had two children:

 Lord Edward Anthony Charles FitzRoy (26 August 1928 – 25 November 2007), married Veronica Mary Ruttledge and had issue.
 Lord Michael Charles FitzRoy (18 March 1932– 15 July 1954), died in the Solomon Islands (missing, presumed drowned).

The year after his second wife's death, he married, thirdly, Rita Emily Carr-Ellison (24 October 1911 – 24 August 1970), daughter of John Ralph Carr-Ellison and of his wife, Alice Ursula Lang. The ceremony took place on 18 July 1944.

He died at Bury St Edmunds on 11 November 1970.

References 
 "Duke of Grafton, Soldier and Landowner", The Times (13 November 1970): 12.
 "Duke of Grafton, An Outstanding Agriculturalist", The Times (19 November 1970): 13.

External links

Grafton, Charles FitzRoy, 10th Duke of
Grafton, Charles FitzRoy, 10th Duke of
110
Charles
C
Schuyler family
English people of Dutch descent
People educated at Wellington College, Berkshire
Graduates of the Royal Military College, Sandhurst
Royal Welch Fusiliers officers
British Army personnel of World War I
People from the Borough of St Edmundsbury